Cranaodes is a genus of moths belonging to the family Tineidae.

References

Tineidae
Taxa named by Edward Meyrick
Tineidae genera